George Denison (February 22, 1790 – August 20, 1831) was a member of the United States House of Representatives from Pennsylvania.

Biography
Denison (uncle of Charles Denison) was born in Kingston, Pennsylvania.  He attended the Wilkes-Barre Academy.  He served as clerk of the Wilkes-Barre borough council from 1811 to 1814, and member of the council for many years, serving as president in 1823 and 1824.  He served as recorder and registrar of Luzerne County, Pennsylvania, from 1812 to 1815.  He studied law, was admitted to the bar in 1813 and commenced practice in Luzerne County.

He was a member of the Pennsylvania House of Representatives in 1815 and 1816.  He was elected as a Republican to the Sixteenth and Seventeenth Congresses.  He served as chairman of the United States House Committee on Expenditures in the Post Office Department in the Seventeenth Congress.  He was not a candidate for renomination.

He resumed the practice of law and served as deputy attorney general for Luzerne County in 1824.  He was again elected to the Pennsylvania House of Representatives in 1827, and served until his death.  He was burgess of Wilkes-Barre Borough in 1829 and 1830.  He died in Wilkes-Barre in 1831.  Interment in Hollenback Cemetery.

Sources

The Political Graveyard

Members of the Pennsylvania House of Representatives
People from the Scranton–Wilkes-Barre metropolitan area
People from Kingston, Pennsylvania
Pennsylvania lawyers
1790 births
1831 deaths
Democratic-Republican Party members of the United States House of Representatives from Pennsylvania
19th-century American politicians
19th-century American lawyers